Oenopota morchi is a species of sea snail, a marine gastropod mollusk in the family Mangeliidae.

Description

Distribution
This marine species occurs off Nova Zembla, in the Arctic Ocean, to Bering Strait and in the Prince William Sound.

References

 Leche W. (1878). Öfversigt öfver de af svenska expeditionerna till Novaja Semlja och Jenissej 1875 och 1876 insamlade. Hafsmollusker. Kungliga Svenska Vetenskaps-Akademiens Handlingar, N.F., 16(2):  p. 57, pi. 1, fig. 18

External links
  Dall, William Healey. Summary of the marine shellbearing mollusks of the northwest coast of America: from San Diego, California, to the Polar Sea, mostly contained in the collection of the United States National Museum, with illustrations of hitherto unfigured species. No. 112. Govt. print. off., 1921  

morchi
Gastropods described in 1878